Anton Olegovich Apatin (born 6 September 1986) is a Russian former football player.

Club career
He made his debut in the Russian Second Division for FC Sever Murmansk on 18 April 2011 in a game against FC Pskov-747 Pskov.

He made his Russian Football National League debut for FC Dynamo St. Petersburg on 12 July 2014 in a game against FC Tosno.

References

External links
 
 

1986 births
People from Murmansk
Sportspeople from Murmansk Oblast
Living people
Russian footballers
Association football midfielders
FC Sever Murmansk players
FC Dynamo Saint Petersburg players
FC Dynamo Bryansk players